Biyaheng Langit (English: The Heavenly Voyage) is a current affairs program which airs the many Overseas Filipino Workers from the Philippines. Biyaheng Langit is aired back-to-back with its companion show Kasangga Mo ang Langit every Saturday at 2:00 pm to 3:00 pm PST over RJDigiTV and is produced by Heavenly Images Productions for Television, Inc. hosted by Rey Langit, Sarah Balabagan and Rey's two sons Reyster Langit and Reynante "JR" Langit, Jr.

The show has been hosted by Rey Langit following his failed senatorial bid in the 1998 Presidential Elections through the Partido para sa Demokratikong Reporma–Lapiang Manggagawa (Reporma–LM). His first co-hosts were the late Reyster Langit, who died of heart failure due to cerebral malaria, a disease he contracted in Palawan while he was on assignment, and Sarah Balabagan, who was known for her trial in the United Arab Emirates. They were replaced by Reyster's younger brother, Reynante "JR" Langit, Jr.

History
Biyaheng Langit was first aired on RPN from April 8, 2000 to March 10, 2007. Rey Langit, who had an unsuccessful senatorial bid in the 1998 Presidential Elections through the Partido para sa Demokratikong Reporma–Lapiang Manggagawa (Reporma–LM) two years ago, was joined by his late son Reyster Langit and partner Sarah Balabagan.

The Death of Reyster Langit
On June 2, 2005 Reyster died of heart failure due to cerebral malaria, a disease he contracted while on assignment in Palawan for Kasangga Mo ang Langit.
Reyster wrote a letter to his family

JR replaces his older brother Reyster and partner Sarah                                                                                                                                                               
Following his death, Rey's surviving son, JR, has since joined him not only for Biyaheng Langit but also for Kasangga Mo ang Langit.

The show moved to IBC from January 5, 2008 to September 13, 2013 and later moved to PTV from September 22, 2013 to August 31, 2019 and later moved to RJTV from September 7, 2019 to present.

Moved to BEAM TV From April 23, 2022 At 2:00-3:00 PM Simulcast on RJTV

Rey Langit's departure
On February 12, 2022 Rey Langit bid farewell to the show to run for senator. and His Friend former Ulat Bayan anchor Erwin Tulfo to run for Partylist Following that, JR Langit remained as a sole host and continued his role until 2022. By that time, it was reformatted as a magazine show.

Hosts
Main Hosts
Rey Langit (2000–present)
JR Langit (2005–present)
Former Hosts
Reyster Langit+ (2000-2005)
Sarah Balabagan (2000–2003)

See also
 List of programs previously broadcast by Radio Philippines Network
 List of programs previously broadcast by Intercontinental Broadcasting Corporation
 List of programs aired by People's Television Network
 List of programs broadcast by RJTV

References

External links

Philippine television shows
2000 Philippine television series debuts
2010s Philippine television series
2020s Philippine television series
People's Television Network original programming
Radio Philippines Network original programming
RPN News and Public Affairs shows
Intercontinental Broadcasting Corporation original programming
IBC News and Public Affairs shows
Filipino-language television shows